Lalchhuanliana (born 11 May 1988) is an Indian cricketer. He made his Twenty20 debut on 11 January 2021, for Mizoram in the 2020–21 Syed Mushtaq Ali Trophy. He made his List A debut on 21 February 2021, for Mizoram in the 2020–21 Vijay Hazare Trophy.

References

External links
 

1988 births
Living people
Indian cricketers
Mizoram cricketers
Place of birth missing (living people)